David Houle may refer to:

 David Houle (biologist), evolutionary biologist 
 David Houle (futurist) (born 1948), futurist and author
 Dave Houle (born 1953), high school coach